NewDealDesign is a San Francisco-based design studio led by founder and principal designer, Gadi Amit. The studio consists of industrial, graphic, and interaction designers as well as mechanical engineers who help develop new technology products.

History 

NewDealDesign was founded in 2000 by Gadi Amit and Chris Lenart. Prior to founding the agency, Amit was Vice President of Design at Frog Design in San Francisco. He began his career in design at Scailex, an Israel-based design firm, after graduating from the Bezalel Academy of Arts and Design in Jerusalem.

Design and Growth 

Many of NewDealDesign’s projects are consumer electronics and wearable technology for companies, including Fitbit, Google, Intel, Dell, Lytro, Whistle and Sproutling.

The 2003 introduction of the PalmOne Zire 21, one of the fastest-selling PDAs of the early 2000s, gave NewDealDesign its breakthrough success. The product design was recognized by Bloomberg Businessweek for “expanding its appeal beyond the techie and corporate communities to the broader consumer market, especially women and first-time buyers.” In 2004, the NewDeal-designed Netgear Platinum II.

References

External links 
 NewDealDesign website
 Gadi Amit's design blog for FastCompany

Design
Design companies of the United States
Companies based in San Francisco
2000 establishments in California
Industrial design firms
Graphic design studios
Product development
Product design